Andrew Cantrill FRSA is a British-born organist and choral director.  He has held cathedral positions in New Zealand and the United States, and was  organist of the Royal Hospital School, Holbrook, Suffolk until September 2018. He is a Fellow, prize-winner and former Trustee Council member of the Royal College of Organists, and a Fellow of the Royal Society of Arts. He is a tutor for the RCO Academy Organ School, an examiner for the Associated Board of the Royal Schools of Music, an active recitalist, and a sought-after broadcaster, writer and presenter.

Education
Andrew Cantrill was a music scholar at Reigate Grammar School, and organ scholar at Barnard Castle School. He studied music at Durham University, where he was organ scholar of the College of St Hild and St Bede, conductor of the University Chamber Choir and Chamber Orchestra, and assistant conductor of the University Choral Society.  He graduated in 1991 with the Eve Myra Kisch Prize for Music.  His organ teachers have included James Lancelot, Peter Wright, Susi Jeans and Gerre Hancock.

Career
He has been assistant organist of Hampstead Parish Church, Master of the Choristers at Grimsby Minster, Director of Music at Saint Paul's Cathedral, Wellington, New Zealand, Organist-Choirmaster at St Paul's Cathedral, Buffalo, New York, US, and Organist & Master of the Choristers at Croydon Minster, London.

During his time in New Zealand, Andrew Cantrill was Musical Director of Orpheus Choir of Wellington, with whom he conducted both Orchestra Wellington and the New Zealand Symphony Orchestra.  He was tutor in organ at the Massey University Conservatorium of Music, and appeared regularly on Radio NZ's Concert FM as organ soloist, accompanist and presenter.  In recent years, his articles on organ performance have appeared in Organists' Review and Cathedral Music, and he has lectured for the Royal College of Organists and Incorporated Association of Organists. He appears as a presenter in videos on the iRCO website, introducing players to the organ and to improvisation.

At the Royal Hospital School he was responsible for the famed 4-manual Hill, Norman & Beard Grand Organ of 1933. The instrument has a British Institute of Organ Studies Grade 1 Historic Organ listing, and was regularly heard in the many chapel services and concerts.

As a recitalist, Cantrill has played in many celebrated British, European, American and Australasian venues.

References

External links
 Reigate Grammar School
 Barnard Castle School
 Trust CDs
 Raven CDs
 BCDS
 Croydon Parish Church
 An introduction to the Pipe Organ with Andrew Cantrill

1971 births
Cathedral organists
English classical organists
British male organists
Living people
People educated at Barnard Castle School
Alumni of the College of St Hild and St Bede, Durham
21st-century organists
21st-century British male musicians
Male classical organists